The 2008 Malaysian Grand Prix (formally the 2008 Formula 1 Petronas Malaysian Grand Prix) was a Formula One motor race held on 23 March 2008 at the Sepang International Circuit, Sepang, Malaysia. It was the 2nd race of the 2008 Formula One season. The 56-lap race was won by Kimi Räikkönen for the Ferrari team after starting from second position. Robert Kubica finished second in a BMW Sauber car, with Heikki Kovalainen third in a McLaren.

It was an all-Ferrari front row, as Felipe Massa started from pole position, with Räikkönen alongside. The McLarens of Kovalainen and Lewis Hamilton had been expected to line up behind the Ferraris on the second row, but both drivers were given five-place grid penalties post-qualifying for holding up Nick Heidfeld and Fernando Alonso respectively, dropping them to eighth and ninth on the grid. Massa cut across his Ferrari teammate at the start, to stop him overtaking on the run to turn one. The top four of Massa, Räikkönen, Kubica and Mark Webber held station until the first round of pit stops. Räikkönen took the lead after these stops and after Massa retired following a spin into the gravel, the Finn cruised to a victory of nearly twenty seconds. Championship leader Hamilton could only finish in fifth position, after a tardy first stop on lap 19, with his McLaren team encountering a problem on his front right tyre and lost ground while trying to pass Webber.

Despite his fifth position, Hamilton kept the Drivers' Championship lead with 14 points, closely followed by Räikkönen and Heidfeld on 11. In the Constructors' Championship, McLaren also kept their lead, with their five-point lead from Australia staying intact. BMW Sauber moved into second place on 19, with Ferrari in third on 11.

Report

Background
The Grand Prix was contested by 22 drivers, in 11 teams of two. The teams, also known as "constructors", were Ferrari, McLaren-Mercedes, Renault, Honda, Force India, BMW Sauber, Toyota, Red Bull Racing, Williams, Toro Rosso and Super Aguri.

Prior to the race, McLaren driver Lewis Hamilton led the Drivers' Championship with 10 points, and BMW Sauber driver Nick Heidfeld was second with 8 points. Behind them in the Drivers' Championship, Nico Rosberg was third with 6 points in a Williams, and Fernando Alonso was fourth with 5 points in a Renault. Hamilton's teammate Heikki Kovalainen was fifth with 4 points. In the Constructors' Championship, McLaren–Mercedes were leading with 14 points, five points ahead of Williams, and BMW Sauber were third with 8 points.

Practice and qualifying

Three practice sessions were held before the race; the first was held on Friday morning and the second on Friday afternoon. Both sessions lasted 1 hour and 30 minutes with weather conditions dry throughout. The third session was held on Saturday morning and lasted an hour.

In the first session, Massa was fastest on a lap of 1:35.392, which was over a second faster than any of his rivals. Räikkönen ended up second, despite running out of fuel during the session, and Kovalainen ended up third, just under a tenth of a second slower than his fellow Finn. Also during the session, the Red Bull Racing machine of David Coulthard suffered a track rod failure on the curb of turn 12, and forced the team to show the FIA clarification that their car design was safe for the Grand Prix, under Article 2.3 of the 2008 Formula One Technical Regulations. Coulthard sat out the second practice session, which saw Hamilton top the timesheets with a lap of 1:35.055, beating Massa by 0.151 seconds, with Räikkönen a further two tenths back in third. In preparation for the qualifying session, many teams put their cars on soft tyres for the third practice session. The soft tyre gives better performance than the harder type of tyre but is less durable than the harder compound. Just like in Australia, the BMW of Heidfeld was fastest, setting a lap of 1:35.019, edging out the Ferraris of Räikkönen and Massa with Jarno Trulli's Toyota fourth, ending up just one-thousandth of a second behind Massa's time.

In qualifying, Massa earned his tenth career pole position, after recording a lap of 1:35.748 during the third and final session. He was joined on the front row by teammate Räikkönen, although the Finn's fastest time was more than half a second slower than that of Massa. Third and fourth had originally gone to the McLarens of Kovalainen and Hamilton, however post-qualifying, both drivers were demoted five places on the grid for dangerous driving; having completed their flying laps, the McLaren pair and other drivers slowed to conserve fuel on their in-laps, and impeded Nick Heidfeld of BMW Sauber and Fernando Alonso of Renault whilst they were both on flying laps. This led to a new rule being introduced for Bahrain giving drivers a set time to complete in-laps in. McLaren's misfortune was to the gain of the Toyota of Trulli, both victims of the impeding (Heidfeld and Alonso), Heidfeld's teammate Kubica and Webber's Red Bull machine. Timo Glock rounded out the top ten in his Toyota.

Race

At the start Massa came across the track to prevent Räikkönen from overtaking him. Further back, Hamilton was able to move up to fifth and Webber up to fourth. Also on the first lap, Sébastien Bourdais spun out of the race. A crash between the Williams of Nico Rosberg and Glock's Toyota happened a few corners later, in which Rosberg destroyed the front wing of his Williams FW30 and forced Glock to retire from the race. On lap four, Alonso and Heidfeld overtook the Red Bull of David Coulthard for ninth and eighth respectively. Adrian Sutil was forced to retire two laps later when he ran off the track and onto the grass, with hydraulic problems.

By lap nine Hamilton was within two seconds of Webber and the Ferraris of Massa and Räikkönen had opened up a lead on the rest of the field. Both set new fastest lap times over the next four laps. Webber pitted on lap 16, Massa on lap 17 and Räikkönen on lap 18, coming out ahead of Massa. Hamilton pitted on lap 19 and the team had a problem getting his front right tyre off, forcing him to stop for almost twenty seconds, and in the process he lost around twelve seconds to the Ferraris, meaning he came out behind Webber in 11th.

Räikkönen took the lead for the first time when Kubica pitted on lap 21. He would open up a lead of almost four seconds in the next six laps. Hamilton was up to seventh by lap 26 but was still unable to overtake Webber. Hamilton was within half a second of him by lap 29 but this forced him to brake harder and lose time to the rest of the field. Massa spun out of the race on lap 31 getting trapped in the gravel. This gave Räikkönen a lead of over 20 seconds from the next driver Kubica. Hamilton finally overtook Webber on lap 40 when he pitted. Vettel's engine failed one lap later and he was forced to retire. Hamilton would stay ahead of Webber after his second pit stop on lap 44. He was now six seconds behind Trulli in fourth and  began to close that margin in the closing laps.

Alonso in eighth now began closing in on Webber. Hamilton was within two seconds of Trulli with two laps to go but was unable to pass him before the end of the race. Räikkönen won the race by nearly twenty seconds from Kubica who had his best ever finish in second; Kovalainen came third. Nick Heidfeld and BMW Sauber earned their first fastest lap, giving  Heidfeld a record in "most races before first fastest lap" with 134,  surpassing the former record of 114 held by Thierry Boutsen.

Classification

Qualifying

  – Lewis Hamilton and Heikki Kovalainen were each put back five places on the grid for impeding Nick Heidfeld and Fernando Alonso, respectively, during Q3.
  – Kazuki Nakajima incurred a ten-place grid penalty for colliding with Robert Kubica in the Australian Grand Prix.

Race

Championship standings after the race 

Drivers' Championship standings

Constructors' Championship standings

 Note: Only the top five positions are included for both sets of standings.

See also 
 2008 Malaysian GP2 Asia Series round
 2008 Malaysian Speedcar Series round

References

External links

 Official Malaysian Grand Prix results from FiA website from Formula 1 website
 Detailed Malaysian Grand Prix results

Malaysian Grand Prix
Malaysia
Grand Prix
Malaysian Grand Prix